Ray Crozier (25 August 1930 – 22 September 2015) was an Australian rules footballer who played with Footscray in the Victorian Football League (VFL).

Notes

External links 		
		
		
		
		
		
		
2015 deaths		
1930 births		
Australian rules footballers from Victoria (Australia)		
Western Bulldogs players
Morwell Football Club players